Ciliated cyst of the vulva (also known as "Cutaneous Müllerian cyst," and "Paramesonephric mucinous cyst of the vulva") is a cutaneous condition characterized by a cyst of the vulva.

See also 
 Ceruminoma
 List of cutaneous conditions

References 

Epidermal nevi, neoplasms, and cysts